The 37th Wisconsin Infantry Regiment was a volunteer infantry regiment that served in the Union Army during the American Civil War.

Service
The 37th Wisconsin was organized at Madison, Wisconsin, and mustered into Federal service on April 9, 1864.

The regiment was mustered out on July 27, 1865.

Casualties
The 37th Wisconsin suffered 7 officers and 149 enlisted men killed or fatally wounded in action and 2 officers and 89 enlisted men who died of disease, for a total of 247 fatalities.

Commanders
 Colonel Samuel Harriman
 Colonel John Green

See also

 List of Wisconsin Civil War units
 Wisconsin in the American Civil War

References
The Civil War Archive

External links
 

Military units and formations established in 1864
Military units and formations disestablished in 1865
Units and formations of the Union Army from Wisconsin
1864 establishments in Wisconsin